The 1968 North Carolina A&T College Aggies football team represented the Agricultural and Technical College of North Carolina—now known as North Carolina A&T State University—as a member of the Central Intercollegiate Athletic Association (CIAA) during the 1968 NCAA College Division football season. The team was led by first-year head coach Hornsby Howell and played their home games at World War Memorial Stadium in Greensboro, North Carolina. The Aggies finished the season 8–1 overall and 6–1 in conference play, placing second in the CIAA. North Carolina A&T won its first black college football national championship.

Previous season
In the previous season, the Aggies finished the season 3–5–1. The aggies lost conference games against: Norfolk, Maryland Eastern Shore, Morgan State and FAMU.

Schedule

Post season

1969 NFL/AFL Draft
The 1969 NFL/AFL Draft was held on January 28–29, 1969 at the Belmont Plaza Hotel in New York, New York. The following A&T players were either selected or signed as undrafted free agents following the draft.

References

North Carolina AandT
North Carolina A&T Aggies football seasons
Black college football national champions
North Carolina AandT Football